Garra variabilis is a species of ray-finned fish in the genus Garra from Lebanon, Turkey, Syria and Iraq.

References 

Garra
Fish described in 1843